City Island is a 2009 American comedy-drama film directed and written by Raymond De Felitta and starring Andy Garcia, Julianna Margulies, Alan Arkin, Emily Mortimer and Ezra Miller. It premiered at the Tribeca Film Festival in New York City on April 26, 2009. The title refers to the Bronx's City Island, where the film is set.

Plot
Living on City Island, in the Bronx, Vince Rizzo, a prison guard, is the father of a dysfunctional family whose members all have secrets. Vince discovers that his secret illegitimate son is now the 24-year-old prison inmate Tony Nardella who is being held in the same prison where he works. Without revealing this truth to his family, Vince consequently gets Tony out of prison and employs him as hired help at his own home in order to become closer with his unknowing son. Vince has also been secretly taking acting lessons, taught by Michael Malakov, and begins to form a platonic bond with Molly, an aspiring actress.

Meanwhile, Vince's 20-year-old daughter Vivian (played by the real-life daughter of her on-screen father) has not told her family that she has been suspended from college, lost her scholarship, gotten breast implants, and become a stripper to try to pay for her next semester; their youngest teenage child, Vinnie, has a secret sexual fetish for feeding large women, and fantasizes about their fat next-door neighbor; and Vince's wife, Joyce, thinking she has lost all marital intimacy, sexually pursues Tony without realizing that he is her stepson.

Vince successfully auditions for a part in a Martin Scorsese film, while his wife and Tony seek each other's sexual attention. Vince, Jr. befriends the neighbor, who helps to bring him closer to an overweight girl whom he has been attracted to at school.

Tensions rise as the family's many dysfunctions come to a head. Tony, finally deciding to escape the insanity of the Rizzo household, steals their car but finds Vivian working at the strip club. Just before the group is nearly torn apart in a violent outburst, Vince reveals the truth about everything, with Tony discovering in amazement that the dysfunctional family he sought to escape is actually his own. Vivian and the others admit their faults and Vince acknowledges the family's problems with the desire to work them out. The finally relieved group reunites in forgiveness toward one another, welcoming the overwhelmed Tony as a new member of their bizarre but loving family. Vince lands the film role.

Cast

 Andy García as Vince Rizzo
 Julianna Margulies as Joyce Rizzo
 Steven Strait as Tony
 Emily Mortimer as Molly
 Ezra Miller as Vince Jr.
 Dominik García-Lorido as Vivian Rizzo
 Carrie Baker Reynolds as Denise
 Hope Glendon-Ross as Cheryl
 Alan Arkin as Michael Malakov

Reception
City Island received generally positive reviews. It holds an 81% approval rating on Rotten Tomatoes, based on 101 reviews, and an average rating of 6.8/10. The website's critical consensus states, "Raymond De Felitta combines warmth, humanity, and a natural sense of humor, and is abetted by Andy Garcia and an excellent ensemble cast." On Metacritic, which uses a weighted average score based on reviews from critics, the film has a score of 66 out of 100, indicating "generally favorable reviews".

As for box office, the film was a modest success, grossing $6,671,036 domestically and $7,875,862 worldwide based on a $6 million budget.

Awards
 Received the First Place Audience Award at the Tribeca Film Festival.

References

External links
 
 
 
 
 
 

2009 films
2009 comedy-drama films
2009 independent films
2000s American films
2000s English-language films
American comedy-drama films
American independent films
City Island, Bronx
Films about dysfunctional families
Films about striptease
Films directed by Raymond De Felitta
Films scored by Jan A. P. Kaczmarek
Films set in the Bronx
Films set on islands
Films shot in New York City